Adami is a surname. Notable people with the surname include:

 Adam Adami (footballer), (born 1992) Brazilian football player
 Adam Adami (diplomat), (ca. 1610–1663) German diplomat and priest
 Chris Adami (born 1962), German physicist and evolutionary theorist
 Eddie Fenech Adami, (born 1934) Prime Minister of Malta 1987–1996 & 1998–2004
 Guy Adami, TV personality, one of the Fast Money (CNBC) five
 Joam Mattheus Adami (1576-1633), Italian Jesuit missionary
 Luigi Adami (1900–1985), Italian sports shooter
 Pavol Adami, (1739–1814) Slovak scientist and scholar
 Pietro Adami, 18th-century Italian painter
 Valerio Adami, (born 1935) Italian painter

References

Italian-language surnames
Surnames from given names